Tally Lake is a freshwater lake located in Flathead County, Montana in the northwestern region of the United States. The lake is about 20 miles west of the town of Whitefish.  It is a popular lake for recreational activities including fishing, boating, swimming and cliff jumping, and hiking on the surrounding trails, and is notable for its great depth and unusual geology.  The lake's surface area is over 1200 acres. The lake is located at roughly 3,500 feet above sea level. It is about 445 feet deep at its deepest point (though some cite its depth as being even greater), making it the deepest lake in Montana and the deepest natural lake.  Despite its large volume, the lake tends to be warm in late summer because its waters are darkly colored due to high levels of tannins (which are harmless). These cause the lake to absorb and retain more heat than comparatively clearer bodies of water in the region.

Tally Lake is home to a number of fish species which make it a popular site for fishing.  These include whitefish, perch, and brook, lake and rainbow trout.

Tributaries 
 Logan Creek
 Griffin Creek
 McGovern Creek
 Hand Creek
 Sheppard Creek
 Dunsire Creek
 Listle Creek
 Sinclair Creek
 Swaney Creek
 Swanson Creek
 Oettiker Creek
 Reid Creek
 Stillwater River

See also
List of lakes in Flathead County, Montana (M-Z)

References 

Lakes of Flathead County, Montana